Ralph Betza (born 1945) is a FIDE Master and inventor of chess variants such as Chess with different armies, Avalanche chess, and Way of the Knight.

Invented chess variants

 Multiplayer Chess (date unknown)
 High-Low Chess (1968)
 Strange Relay Chess (1970s)
 Coordinate Chess (or Co-Chess) (1973)
 Conversion Chess (1973)
 Co-Relay Chess (1973)
 Double Conversion Chess (1973)
 Heterocoalescence Chess (1973) by Philip Cohen, based on an idea by Betza 
 Inverter Chess (or Switch Chess) (1973) 
 Metamorphosis (c. 1973)
 Pinwheel Chess (1973)
 Reversion Conversion Chess (1973) 
 Transportation Chess (or Transchess) (1973)
 Watergate Chess (1973)
 Weak! (1973)
 Biflux Chess (1974) a variant of Co-Chess
 Brownian Motion Chess (1974)
 Cassandra Chess (1974)
 Orbital Chess (1974)
 Overloader/Restorer Chess (O/R Chess) (1974)
 Put-back Transchess (1974)
 Almost Chess (1977)
 Ambition Chess (1977)
 Autorifle Chess (1977) after Bill Rawlings
 Avalanche Chess (1977) 
 Blizzard Chess (1977)
 Buzzard Chess (1977)
 List Chess (1977)
 Plague Chess (1977) after S. Walker; variants are Biological Warfare Chess, and Immunity  
 Twinkle Chess (1977)
 Very Scottish Chess (1977)
 Ghostrider Chess (1978)
 Incognito Chess (1978)
 Liars' Chess (1978)
 Tutti-Frutti Chess (1978) with Philip Cohen
 Chess with different armies (or Betza's Chess, or Equal Armies) (1979)
 Suction Chess (1979)
 One-Shot Chess (1980)
 Swarm Chess (1980)
 Koopa Chess (1990)
 Way Of The Knight (WOTN) (1992)
 Chess on a Really Big Board (or Four Board Chess, or Chess on Four Boards) (1996)
 Earthquake Chess (1996)
 Narrow Chess (1996)
 Taxi Chess (1996)
 Trapdoor Chess (1996)
 The Game of Nemoroth (2002)

References

Chess FIDE Masters
American chess players
Chess variant inventors
1945 births
Living people

External links
Betza's website about his chess variants, hosted by The Chess Variant Pages